Roger Osborne may refer to:
Roger Osborne (born 1950), British former professional footballer
Roger Osborne (author) of "The Floating Egg"
Roger Osborne (writer) (1936–2007), American writer
Buzz Osborne (born Roger Osborne 1964), American guitarist, vocalist and songwriter, member of the Melvins